Gisle Torvik (born 2 June 1975) is a Norwegian jazz musician (guitar) from Tørvikbygd in Hardanger.

Career 
Torvik was born in Bergen, and spent three years studying music at the Nordic Institute of Stage and Studio (Oslo, 1995–98) with a major in guitar and composition. He is considered one of the most talented Nordic jazz guitarists. Torvik released his first album in 1999 called Naken uten gitar (which translates to "Naked without guitar"), where Sigmund Groven, Petter Wettre, Frode Berg, Endre Christiansen and Torstein Lofthus contributed.

The album Frozen Moment was released in 2009 (ten years after his initial album) featuring Hilde Norbakken (on vocals and piano), to good reviews. The release concert was housed by 'Herr Nilsen' in Oslo 21 September 2009.

In 2011 Torvik reached the semi-final of ISC International Songwriting Competition with the tune "I remember".   He is first and foremost a jazz guitarist, but is as comfortable in other genera of music. On his latest album Tranquil Fjord (2013), he presents his multifaceted aspects in a brilliant way.

Torvik works as a composer, musician, arranger, producer as well as a music teacher, and plays Sadowsky guitars. He has been working with musicians such as Eddie Gómez, Bendik Hofseth, Dean Johnson, Sigmund Groven, Øystein Sevåg, Tony Moreno, Karl Seglem and many more.

At Vossajazz 2014, he gave a gigg presenting his "fjord-jazz" accompanied by Karl Seglem and Eple Trio, including Andreas Ulvo, Sigurd Hole and Jonas Howden Sjøvaag.

Discography 
1999: Naken Uten Gitar ("Naked Without Guitar")
2009: Frozen Moment (Up North Discs), feat. Hilde Norbakken
2013: Tranquil Fjord (Ozella Music/NorCD), with Audun Ellingsen & Hermund Nygård
2014: Kryssande (NorCD), with Hardanger Big Band

References

External links 

Tranquil Fjord by Gisle Torvik, exclusive jazz guitar solo piece and music video in HD on YouTube
Gisle Torvik - Eple Trio - Karl Seglem @ Vossajazz 2014 on YouTube

Norwegian jazz guitarists
Norwegian jazz composers
Musicians from Kvam
Living people
1975 births
21st-century Norwegian guitarists
NorCD artists